Levski (formerly known as Dolno Levski) is a village at 23 km south of Panagyurishte and 21 km north of Pazardzhik on the main road between them. As of 2013 it has a population of 667.

Geography 

The village is located on the southern foothills of the Sredna Gora mountain at an altitude of 420 m. It is situated on the main road Panagyurishte-Bata-Popintsi-Levski-Saraya-Pazardzhik. The river Luda Yana flows near the village. There are four micro dams in the land of Levski.

There are grapes from which the locals produce wine and rakiya. The population is employed in agriculture, stock=breeding and mining of copper.

Many ancient Thracian mounds are scattered in the lands of the village as well as remains of a Thracian settlement.

The population is Orthodox Christian.

History 

The local population actively participated in the April Uprising of 1876 against the Ottoman domination and the September Uprising (1923). The village was known as Kalaglare up to 1934 and Dolno Levski up to 1987.

Events 
 Dzhumal (Kukeri)

People 
 Atanas Saev (1883 - 1963) - Bulgarian revolutionary, voivoda in the Internal Macedonian Revolutionary Organization

Notes 

Villages in Pazardzhik Province